Ludovic Viltard (born 1 October 1983 in Perpignan, France) is a French former professional footballer who played as a forward and made four appearances in Ligue 2 for clubs RC Strasbourg and FC Lorient between 2000 and 2003.

References

External links

1983 births
Living people
French footballers
Association football forwards
RC Strasbourg Alsace players
FC Lorient players
Sportspeople from Perpignan
Footballers from Occitania (administrative region)